Bowron may refer to:

Bowron Lake Provincial Park, provincial park in British Columbia, Canada
Bowron River originates in Bowron Lake Provincial Park and flows north to join the Fraser River
Fletcher Bowron (1887–1968), four-term reform mayor of Los Angeles, California